Elizabeth "Bessie" Manu (born 16 September 1986 in Wellington, New Zealand) is a New Zealand netball player in the ANZ Championship, playing for the Central Pulse. Manu previously played with the Canterbury Tactix in 2008, after having been a member of the Canterbury Flames team in the National Bank Cup. She is also a former member of the New Zealand Secondary Schools and New Zealand U21 teams.

References

External links
 2010 ANZ Championship profile

New Zealand netball players
Mainland Tactix players
Central Pulse players
Sportspeople from Wellington City
1986 births
Living people
People educated at Rangi Ruru Girls' School
ANZ Championship players
Team Bath netball players
New Zealand expatriate netball people in England
Canterbury Flames players
Waikato Bay of Plenty Magic players